A manse is a clergy house inhabited by, or formerly inhabited by, a minister, usually used in the context of Presbyterian, Methodist, Baptist and other Christian traditions.

Ultimately derived from the Latin mansus, "dwelling", from manere, "to remain", by the 16th century the term meant both a dwelling and, in ecclesiastical contexts, the amount of land needed to support a single family.

Many notable Scots have been called "sons (or daughters) of the manse", and the term is a recurring point of reference within Scottish media and culture. For example, former Prime Minister Gordon Brown was described as a "son of the manse" as he is the son of a Presbyterian minister.

When selling a former manse, the Church of Scotland always requires that the property should not be called "The Manse" by the new owners, but "The Old Manse" or some other acceptable variation. The intended result is that "The Manse" refers to a working building rather than simply applying as a name.

See also
Glebe – an area of land within an ecclesiastical parish used to support a parish priest.

References

 
Scottish culture
Church of Scotland